Nell Gwyn (1650–1687) was an actress and long-time mistress of King Charles II of England.

Nell Gwyn may also refer to:
 Nell Gwyn (operetta), an 1884 work by Robert Planquette
 Mistress Nell, a 1901 play by George Cochrane Hazelton (actor)
 Nell-Go-In, a burlesque, based on the 1901 Hazelton play by George V. Hobart
 Sweet Nell of Old Drury, a 1911 film starring Nellie Stewart
 Mistress Nell, a 1915 film, starring Mary Pickford, based on the 1901 Hazelton play
 Mistress Nell Gwyn, aka Nell Gwyn: A Decoration, a 1926 novel by Marjorie Bowen
 Nell Gwyn (1926 film), starring Dorothy Gish, based on the 1926 novel
 Nell Gwynn (1934 film), starring Anna Neagle
 Nell Gwynn (play), a 2015 play by Jessica Swale
 Nell Gwyn Stakes, a Group 3 flat horse race in Great Britain
 Nell Gwynne Tavern, a public house at 1–2 Bull Inn Court, Covent Garden, London
 Gargoyle Club, once the Nell Gwynne Revue, a strip club, at 69 Dean Street, Soho, London